Seven vessels of the Royal Navy have been named HMS Arab:

  was an 8-gun schooner, the former French Arabe, captured in 1797, renamed Ant in 1798, and sold in 1815.
  was a 22-gun post ship, originally the French flush-decked privateer Brave, captured in 1798 and fitted as a quarter-decked sloop in the same year. She was sold in 1810. She became a whaler, making seven voyages to the British southern whale fishery. Sank in 1824.
  was an 18-gun  launched in 1812 and wrecked in 1823 off Ireland.
  was a 16-gun  launched in 1847. She was transferred as Coastguard watchvessel No. 18 in 1863 and was broken up in 1879.
  was a  destroyer launched in 1901 and sold in 1919.

See also
 , a naval trawler commanded by Richard Stannard VC. He received the VC for his actions from 28 April to 2 May 1940 at Namsos, Norway, when HMT Arab survived 31 bombing attacks in five days.

References

Royal Navy ship names